Niš Zone League (Serbian: Нишка зона / Niška zona) was one of the Serbian Zone League divisions, the fourth tier of the Serbian football league system. It was run by the Football Association of East Serbia.

The league folded in 2014, together with the Pomoravlje-Timok Zone League. Three new sections were established instead, namely Zone League East, Zone League South and Zone League West.

Seasons

External links
 Football Association of Serbia
 Football Association of East Serbia

Serbian Zone League